Qubeys  قبيس سر در is a member of the Surre, one of the sons of the greater Mehe Dir tribe. Qubeys is brother to Abdalle Surre Dir. Surre (Abdalle & Qubeys)

History & overview
Qubeys قبيس, along with Abdalle, are a subclan of the Surre (clan). Surre Mehe is a member of the Royal Dir tribe.

The Word Qubeys is an ancient Somali word which was once common amongst the traditional Somali population. The word itself means cleanliness. With the introduction of Islam and the Arabic language to Somalia over 1000 years ago, Somalis changed the tradition of naming their sons Qubeys to Dahir or Tahir or طاهر in Arabic which also means cleanliness.

The Qubeys and Abdalleh Surre Dir clans are known to have spread and taught the Islamic religion in southern and central Somalia. With the modern Somali society, it is believed that the Surre, both Qubeys & Abdalle have a large number of Faqīh (Islamic Jurists) and Islamic scholars.

Distribution of Qubeys clan in the Horn of Africa
It is believed by various historians the Qubeys Surre & Abdalle Surre migrated from the northern part of Somalia currently known as Somaliland approximately 1316 A.D. The Surre Clan migrated to parts of southern and central Somalia as well as parts of Ethiopia and Kenya. However a small fraction of the Qubeys clan remained in Somaliland and reside in Togdheer Somaliland till this day.

Currently the Qubeys Clan reside in the following cities. Some which they inhabit alone and some where they are the majority or a significant population of the city:

 Bacadweyne Mudug
 Marajiicley Galgaduud
 Baraagciise
 Qaydaro
 Dhaah
 wardheen
 madiino
 Kabxanley 
 deefow
 Qaycad
Gawaaney
Jaqey
Qobor
 Jamaame
 Labaceel
 jiicdheere
 Luuq
 doolow
 shabeelow
 Golweyn
 salagle
 Somaliland
 Ethiopia
dharkeynley
cabdicasiis

Clan tree
 Dir
 Mehe
Surre
Qubeys
Cabdalle 
1-Tolweyne
Axadoowe
 Abdalla diidshe
reer Qoobweyne
reer Lugey
reer kheyre Afrax Reer Dhoore

 reer Shirwac Jimcaale 
reer waambe 
reer wehliye

 cusmaan Diidshe  
reer Fiqi Yuusuf 
reer Ebeker
reer Yaaquub
reer Abdirahmaan
reer Idiris
reer fiqi Cumar
reer Barqadle 
Reer Muumin Cali
reer Gadiid Nuure
Reer Geedi Gurey
reer Ducaale faarax
Reer Xassan dheere                                                                                                                                                                                                                                                                                                                         
 Reer Toonle
 mohamed abti-udug
. 4 Roqore mohamed 
1.Roble Roble 
2.Bahuuri Roqor 
3.Diinyo Roqor
4.Ali Roqor 
 waqantiile abti-udug
Fiqi yaxye
Fiqi cumar
2-Yabadhaale
Midkasse
Reer Idiris
Reer Cufaa
Reer cusmaan afey
Wayaagle
 reer baani
 dhaah
 sheekh faarax
     -- Axmed
      = afrax

References

Somali clans

Reer kheyre afrax: Halimo yusuuf dhoore freedom fighter